California Society of Addiction Medicine (CSAM) is the California organization of physicians who specialize in treating addiction. Addiction medicine is the medical specialty that provides care and treatment for people with substance use disorder. It includes both pharmaceutical and behavioral treatments and aligns with other specialties including public health, psychiatry and internal medicine. CSAM was founded in 1973, and has been a State Chapter of the American Society of Addiction Medicine since 1989.

CSAM advances the treatment of alcoholism and other addictions through education of physicians, physicians-in-training, and other health professionals. Additionally, CSAM promotes research, prevention and implementation of evidence-based treatment. It advocates for legislation and regulations that improve and expand substance abuse treatment.

Education and research
CSAM provides a wide range of continuing medical education, including a nationally recognized preparatory course for the American Board of Addiction Medicine (ABAM) Certification Exam. CSAM also holds an annual conference on the State of the Art in Addiction Medicine and workshops on issues ranging from pain and addiction and screening and brief intervention to opioid treatment and trauma and addiction.
 
The Medical Education and Research Foundation for the treatment of alcoholism and other drug dependencies was established in 1981 as a sister organization to the California Society of Addiction Medicine. The Foundation’s mission is to increase and improve the education of physicians about all aspects of addiction, including harmful drinking or drug use, medical sequellae, family impact and how to support recovery. Its primary activities are mentored learning experiences at annual, three-day conferences on addiction medicine offered by CSAM.

Advocacy
CSAM members advocate for greater treatment access and improved treatment at the state level among California elected officials and regulators, while partnering with many other medical and nongovernmental organizations. Among the issues that CSAM supports are increasing funding for addiction treatment, raising standards for the substance abuse treatment workforce, improving treatment and prevention for adolescents and young adults and providing better treatment opportunities for health professionals who suffer from the disease of addiction.

Resources
CSAM offers a wide range of information on addiction medicine to health professionals, including materials from its educational conferences and programs and a quarterly newsletter.

References

External links 
 CSAM website
 CSAM education events
 Medical Education and Research Foundation (MERF)
 CSAM public policy
 CSAM resources

Drugs in the United States
Addiction organizations in the United States
Mental health organizations in California